Dansez pentru tine (season 14) of Dansez pentru tine premiered on October 18, 2013. Ștefan Bănică, Jr. and Iulia Vântur returned as hosts. The judges are Emilia Popescu, Mihai Petre, Beatrice Rancea, Edi Stancu and Wilmark Rizzo being replaced by Elwira Petre.

The season concluded on November 29, 2013 with Ilinca Vandici & Răzvan Marton as the winners.

Couples

Scoring chart

  indicates the couple eliminated that week
 indicates the couple finishing in the bottom two
 indicates the winning couple
 indicates the runner-up couple
 indicates the third-place couple
Red numbers the couple(s) with the lowest score for that week
Green numbers the couple(s) with the highest score for that week

Weekly scores and songs

Week 1 (October 18)
 Ștefan Bănică, Jr.'s performance: "Alerg printre stele" (feat. Pacha Man).

First round

Second round

Results

Week 2 (October 25)
 The juries decided that Lilian Carăuş will be the choreograph of Elena & Freek and Andra Gheorghe will now team with Nana & Emanuela.
 Ștefan Bănică, Jr.'s performance: "Super-fata, cea cu vino-ncoa (cantecul tocilarului)".
 Guest : Antonia.

First round
 the contestants choose their type of dance through a draw

Notes

 1. Being first place in the previous edition, the contestants choose their dance without a draw.

Duel

Second round

Results

Week 3 (November 1)
 The juries decided that Georgiana Căiţa will be the choreograph of Ilinca & Răzvan.
 Ștefan Bănică, Jr.'s performance: "It's Only Rock 'n Roll"
 Guest : Mihaela Rădulescu

First round

Duel

Second round
the contestants choose their type of dance through a draw

Notes
 2. Being first place in the previous edition, the team didn't have to choose their type of dance through a draw.

Results

Week 4 (November 8)
 Ștefan Bănică, Jr.'s performance: "Dragostea Doare"
 Guests : The Cheeky Girls.

First round
the contestants choose their type of dance through a draw 

Notes
 3. Being first place in the previous edition, the team didn't have to choose their type of dance through a draw.

Duel

Second round

Results

Week 5 (November 15)

 Ștefan Bănică, Jr.'s performance: "Până la capăt"
 Guest : Oana Roman.

First round
the contestants choose their type of dance through a draw

Notes
 4. Being first place in the previous edition, the team didn't have to choose their type of dance through a draw.

Duel

Second round

Results

Week 6 (November 22)

 Ștefan Bănică, Jr.'s performance: "Ce e dragostea?".
 Guests : Gina Pistol, Jojo, Laura Cosoi and Bruno Icobet.

First round

Duel

Second round

Third round

Results

Week 7 (November 29)

 Ștefan Bănică, Jr.'s performance: TBA
 Guest : Catrinel Menghia, Alexandra Dinu & George Ogararu

Reception

External links
Official website

References

Season 14
2013 Romanian television seasons